The 1984–85 season was Stoke City's 78th season in the Football League and 52nd in the First Division.

Bill Asprey was given the managerial position on a permanent basis by the board following the previous season's close escape. However Stoke won three of their 42 league matches managing to pick up 17 points, a record low which would stand for 21 years. Stoke scored 24 goals and conceded 91 giving them a goal difference of –67. Supporters stopped attending matches with crowds falling below 5,000. The season became known as The Holocaust season and Stoke would not gain a return to the top flight until 2008.

Season review

League
The directors did not hesitate in appointing Bill Asprey on a full-time basis, but there was a shock for the supporters when it was announced that both Paul Maguire and Peter Hampton were being released. Asprey had decided to start building his own team but he knew that there was no money available for him and so a club once filled with international stars had to loan players from other clubs. As the season started goals were almost non-existent and by autumn Asprey had sold Robbie James for £100,000 to Queens Park Rangers so he could buy Keith Bertschin a proven goalscorer from Norwich City.

Still there was no improvement and as the season wore on Stoke struggled to even compete with their First Division rivals and it turned into a case of when and not if Stoke would be relegated. Stoke went down breaking almost every record available: fewest goals scored (24); fewest wins (3); and lowest points tally (17). Ian Painter was top goalscorer with six of which four were penalties. With the season drawing to a close Asprey was relieved of his duties as his health had been affected by the season's traumas and Tony Lacey took over the last eight matches losing all of them. Chairman Frank Edwards took the full brunt of the supporters protests following relegation before he died following a heart attack. Sandy Clubb took over from Edwards and he appointed Mick Mills as manager as the club began to rebuild in the Second Division.

FA Cup
Luton Town knocked out Stoke after a replay in the third round.

League Cup
Stoke were defeated by Third Division Rotherham United in the second round.

Final league table

Results

Stoke's score comes first

Legend

Football League First Division

FA Cup

League Cup

Friendlies

Squad statistics

References

Stoke City F.C. seasons
Stoke